The 1994 European Cup was the 30th edition of the European Cup, IIHF's premier European club ice hockey tournament. The season started on September 16, 1994, and finished on December 30, 1994.

The tournament was won by Jokerit, who beat Lada Togliatti in the final.

Preliminary round
(Zagreb, Croatia)

Standings

First group round

Group A
(Tilburg, Netherlands)

Group A standings

Group B
(Budapest, Hungary)

Group B standings

Group C
(Riga, Latvia)

Group C standings

Group D
(Nowy Targ, Poland)

Group D standings

Group E
(Feldkirch, Vorarlberg, Austria)

Group E standings

 HC Olomouc,
 HC Devils Milano,
 Tivali Minsk,
 EC Hedos München,
 Lada Togliatti,  Malmö IF   :  bye

Second group round

Group F
(Olomouc, Czech Republic)

Group F standings

Group G
(München, Bavaria, Germany)

Group G standings

*  EC Hedos München &  EHC Kloten :  forfeit the tournament

Group H
(Minsk, Belarus)

Group H standings

Group J
(Kristianstad, Sweden)

Group J standings

*  Rouen HC forfeit the tournament

 TPS,
 Jokerit     :  bye

Final stage
(Turku, Finland)

Third round

Group A

Group A standings

Group B

Group B standings

Third place match

Final

References
 Season 1994

1
IIHF European Cup